Carlos Bodega (born 1 September 1975) is a Puerto Rican swimmer. He competed in the men's 4x100 metre medley relay event at the 1996 Summer Olympics. Participated in the 1995 short course World Championships in Rio de Janeiro Brazil, World University Games in 1997 Sicily, Italy and 1999 Palma de Mayorca, Spain. Also won the bronze medal in the 200 IM at the 1993 Central American Games in Ponce PR. Swam and graduated High School at the Bolles School, under Coach Greg Troy in Jacksonville Florida.

References

1975 births
Living people
Puerto Rican male swimmers
Olympic swimmers of Puerto Rico
Swimmers at the 1996 Summer Olympics
Place of birth missing (living people)
20th-century Puerto Rican people
21st-century Puerto Rican people